Baldwin County Airport  is a county-owned, public-use airport in Baldwin County, Georgia, United States. It is located four nautical miles (5 mi, 7 km) north of the central business district of Milledgeville, Georgia. This airport is included in the National Plan of Integrated Airport Systems for 2011–2015, which categorized it as a general aviation facility.

Facilities and aircraft 
Baldwin County Airport covers an area of 200 acres (81 ha) at an elevation of 385 feet (117 m) above mean sea level. It has one runway designated 10/28 with an asphalt surface measuring 5,509 by 99 feet (1,679 x 30 m).

For the 12-month period ending June 11, 2011, the airport had 10,000 general aviation aircraft operations, an average of 27 per day. At that time there were 23 aircraft based at this airport: 87% single-engine and 13% multi-engine.

References

External links 
 MLJ - Baldwin County at Georgia DOT website
 Aerial image as of February 1993 from USGS The National Map
 

Airports in Georgia (U.S. state)
Transportation in Baldwin County, Georgia